Alderney and Bourne Valley is a ward in Poole, Dorset. Since 2019, the ward has elected 3 councillors to Bournemouth, Christchurch and Poole Council.

Geography 
The ward primarily covers the areas of Alderney and Bourne Valley; including Alder Hills and northern Rossmore. It covers most of the area of the former Poole Borough Council Wards of Alderney, and Branksome East, as well as parts of Branksome West. The ward is divided between the parliamentary constituencies of Poole and Bournemouth West.

Councillors 
The ward is currently represented by three Liberal Democrat councillors.

Alderney and Bourne Valley

Former Wards

Alderney

Branksome East

Election results

References 

Wards of Bournemouth, Christchurch and Poole
Politics of Poole